Lebanese people in Saudi Arabia have a population exceeding 120,000 and other estimates report a total of 269,000 Lebanese in Saudi Arabia. Lebanese people form one of the largest community of non-citizen Arabs in Saudi Arabia. In addition, an increasing number of Lebanese students seeking education and career opportunities opted for the country in light of its relatively reputable institutions across the Middle East.

The Lebanese people tend to be spread out over various parts of the country, with areas of high concentration being Riyadh, Jeddah, and Dammam.

Notable people
Al-Waleed bin Talal, Saudi business magnate and investor. He is a member of the Saudi royal family. (Born in Saudi Arabia - Saudi Father/Lebanese Mother - Have a Saudi Arabian citizenship)
Mona Al Solh, former wife of Prince Talal and mother of Al-Waleed bin Talal. 
Rafic Hariri, Lebanese-Saudi business tycoon and the Prime Minister of Lebanon from 1992 to 1998 and again from 2000 until his resignation on 20 October 2004. (Born in Lebanon - In 1965, Hariri left his home and went to Saudi Arabia - Have a Saudi Arabian citizenship from 1978)
Saad Hariri, Lebanese-Saudi billionaire who served as the Prime Minister of Lebanon from 2009 until 2011. (Born in Saudi Arabia - Lebanese father with Saudi citizenship/Iraqi Mother - Have a Saudi Arabian citizenship)
Bahaa Hariri, Lebanese-Saudi billionaire

See also
Lebanon–Saudi Arabia relations
List of Lebanese people (Saudi Arabia)
Lebanese diaspora
2017 Lebanon–Saudi Arabia dispute

References

 

Arabs in Saudi Arabia
Saudi Arabia
Ethnic groups in Saudi Arabia
 
Lebanese emigrants to Saudi Arabia
Saudi
Saudi Arabia